Staab is a German surname that may refer to
 Heinz Staab (1926–2012), German chemist
Henry A. Staab (1875–?), American politician
Monika Staab (born 1959), German football player and manager
 Rebecca Staab (born  1961), American actress
Roy Staab (born 1941), American artist
Steffen Staab (born 1970), German Computer Scientist

German-language surnames